Bronnie Ware (born 19 February 1967) is an Australian author, songwriter and motivational speaker best known for her writings about the top deathbed regrets she heard during her time as a palliative carer described in her book The Top Five Regrets of the Dying.

In 2014 she published a second book, Your Year For Change: 52 Reflections For Regret-Free Living. After having her first child at 45, Ware wrote about her experiences in the book Bloom: A Tale of Courage, Surrender, and Breaking Through Upper Limits.

Bibliography
The Top Five Regrets of the Dying: A Life Transformed by the Dearly Departing (2011)
Your Year For Change: 52 Reflections For Regret-Free Living (2014)
Bloom: A Tale of Courage, Surrender, and Breaking Through Upper Limits (2017)

References

External links
 

1967 births
Living people
Palliative care
Australian memoirists
21st-century memoirists
Australian women memoirists